Xi Zheng (died 278), courtesy name Lingxian, was a Chinese essayist, poet, and politician  of the state of Shu Han during the late Three Kingdoms period of China. He also served as an official in the early years of the Jin dynasty.

Early life
Born Xi Zuan (郤纂) in Yanshi, Henan, Xi Zheng's family moved west from Luoyang into Yi Province (covering present-day Sichuan and Chongqing) when he was very young. When Xi Zheng was still a boy, his father Xi Yi (郤揖) died. He was gifted in language and mostly self-educated in the fields of history and government, borrowing books and essays from literati throughout Yi Province. He entered government service as a clerk of the palace library, eventually rising to the rank of director over the course of 30 years.

Fall of Shu Han

As director of the imperial library, Xi Zheng was a fairly high-ranking official in the Shu government. The powerful eunuch Huang Hao was ambivalent towards him, so Xi Zheng was able to avoid the factionalism that Huang Hao's rise to power engendered.

Xi Zheng's foremost contribution to history was his composition of Liu Shan's surrender document to the Wei general Deng Ai, which survives in the Records of the Three Kingdoms. Xi Zheng remained extremely loyal to Liu Shan, and was one of two former high-ranking Shu officials who abandoned their families and travelled with Liu Shan to Luoyang during Zhong Hui's Rebellion in 264. He was one of five former Shu officials to be enfeoffed as marquises by the Wei government.

In Luoyang, Liu Shan relied on Xi Zheng in matters of deportment and propriety. According to Xi Zuochi's Han Jin Chunqiu, the Wei regent Sima Zhao once asked Liu Shan if he thought much about Shu, to which Liu Shan famously responded that he was too happy to think of Shu. Xi Zheng sought out Liu Shan and advised him that were he asked this again, the appropriate response was to lament how far he had been removed from his family tombs.

In 273, Xi Zheng was appointed as the Administrator of Baxi Commandery (巴西郡), in present-day eastern Sichuan and northern Chongqing. This would have allowed him to return west in his old age. Of his works, only Liu Shan's surrender document to Deng Ai and one other essay survive, both carried in the base text of the Records of the Three Kingdoms.

References
 Chen Shou (280s or 290s). Records of the Three Kingdoms. Pei Songzhi, annotation, 429. Hong Kong: Zhonghua Publishing, 1971. 5 vols.

See also
 Lists of people of the Three Kingdoms

Year of birth unknown
278 deaths
Jin dynasty (266–420) poets
Jin dynasty (266–420) politicians
People of Cao Wei
Poets from Sichuan
Politicians from Sichuan
Political office-holders in Sichuan
Shu Han essayists
Shu Han poets
Shu Han politicians